This is a list of cricket grounds in India that have been used for first-class, List A and Twenty20 cricket games. India has 49 international cricket venues, the most in any country - 26 more than the next most: England with 23.

International cricket

Domestic cricket grounds

Grounds listed in bold have hosted at least one international cricket match.
For grounds listed in italics, the name and exact location used for is unknown.
For grounds that share the same name, the city the ground is in is listed in brackets to avoid confusion.

Andhra Pradesh

Assam

Bihar

Chandigarh

Chhattisgarh

Delhi

Goa

Gujarat

Haryana

Himachal Pradesh

Jammu & Kashmir

Jharkhand

Karnataka

Kerala

Madhya Pradesh 

There are three international venue in Madhya Pradesh. In November 2015, the Holkar Stadium was selected one of the six new Test venue in India.

Maharashtra

Manipur

Meghalaya

Nagaland

Odisha

Punjab

Rajasthan

Sikkim

Tamil Nadu

Telangana

Tripura

Uttar Pradesh

Uttarakhand

West Bengal

Jalpaiguri Stadium || Jalpaiguri || 1999 || 2005 || 0 || 10+ || 0 || 
|}

Indian Premier League grounds 
The first season of the Indian Premier League was held in 2008. South Africa hosted the 2009 tournament due to concerns over player safety during an election year in India, with the final being played at New Wanderers Stadium in Johannesburg.

Proposed Stadiums

Currently Proposed

See also 

 List of international cricket grounds in India
 List of stadiums in India
 List of Field hockey venues in India 
 List of football stadiums in India
 Venues of the 2010 Commonwealth Games

References

External links
 List of cricket grounds in India - CricketArchive
 List of cricket grounds in India - Cricinfo
 Indian Premier League grounds  - CricketArchive

List

Lists of cricket grounds in India
Indian cricket lists